Salem (properly transliterated as ; it can also be a transliteration of the  ; the Jewish and Arabic name is also transliterated as Salem) is an Arabic and Jewish-origin given name and surname, also a Sephardic Jewish surname, and a surname of English origin.

In addition, when transliterated the name Salim can become indistinguishable in English, as the spelling Salem is also used, though with a short a sound and long e sound. In Arabic, the two are distinctly different names, although their meanings are similarly related.

Given name
Salem Chaker (born 1950), Algerian Berberologist
Salem Chalabi (born 1963), Iraqi-American lawyer
 Salem Al Fakir (born 1981), Swedish musician of Syrian origin. Also part of Vargas & Lagola as Lagola 
 Salem al-Hazmi (1981–2001), Saudi hijacker of American Airlines Flight 77 in the September 11 attacks
 Salem bin Laden (1946–1988), Saudi investor
 Salem el-Masri, Egyptian explosives trainer
 Salem Mitchell (born 1998), American model known for her numerous facial freckles
 Salem Poor (1747–1802), African-American soldier
 Salem Abdulaziz Al Sabah (born 1951), Kuwaiti royal and politician

Middle name
 Ali Salem Tamek (born 1973), Sahrawi independence activist

Surname
 Abu Salem (born 1969), Indian mobster
 Ali Salem (1936–2015), Egyptian playwright
 Amr Salem (born 1958), Syrian politician
 Elie Salem (born 1930), Lebanese academic and politician
 Emad Salem, Egyptian FBI informant
 Gamal Salem (1918–1968), Egyptian military officer and politician
 Mahmoud Salem (1931–2013), Egyptian journalist and author
 Mamdouh Salem (1918–1988), Egyptian politician
 Mostafa Salem, Libyan administrator
 Pamela Salem (born 1950), British film and television actress
 Peter Salem (1750-1816), African-American soldier
 Raphaël Salem (1898-1963), Greek-Sephardic mathematician
 Salah Salem (1920–1962), Egyptian military officer and politician

Fictional characters
 Salem Saberhagen, fictional cat
 Salem, the main antagonist of the animated web series RWBY''
 Salem, Tyler The Creator's fictional love interest in his 2013 album Wolf

See also
 Salem (disambiguation)
 Salim (disambiguation), similar name that can become indistinguishable in transliteration

References

Arabic-language surnames
Arabic masculine given names
English-language surnames